Fabian Schnabel (born 18 December 1993) is a German footballer who plays as a forward for SV Schalding-Heining.

References

External links
 

Living people
1993 births
People from Passau
Sportspeople from Lower Bavaria
German footballers
Footballers from Bavaria
Association football forwards
2. Liga (Austria) players
3. Liga players
Regionalliga players
FC Blau-Weiß Linz players
FSV Zwickau players
SV Schalding-Heining players
German expatriate footballers
German expatriate sportspeople in Austria
Expatriate footballers in Austria